Sports Kids Moms & Dads is an American reality television series which premiered on the Bravo cable network on June 1, 2005. The eight-part documentary series follows the lives of several parents and their child athletes, focusing on how they "struggle to excel in the highly stressful, competitive, "win at all costs" world of sports."

The show premiered following the success of another similar reality series entitled Showbiz Moms & Dads and Showdog Moms & Dads.

Roger Catlin of the Hartford Courant criticized the show by saying that it was "all presented without experts stepping in to say how involved parents should be in their children's sports dreams. Instead, it's pure voyeurism."

References

External links 
 
 

2000s American reality television series
2005 American television series debuts
2005 American television series endings
Bravo (American TV network) original programming